The 2008 CAF Beach Soccer Championship also known as the 2008 FIFA Beach Soccer World Cup qualifiers for (CAF) was the third beach soccer championship for Africa, held in March 2008, in Durban, South Africa.
Senegal won the championship, with Cameroon finishing second. The two teams moved on to play in the 2008 FIFA Beach Soccer World Cup in Marseille, France, from July 17- July 28.

Participating nations

Group stage

Group A

Group B

Côte d'Ivoire progressed due to their head-to-head result against Nigeria

Knockout stage

Winners

Final standings

References

Beach
International association football competitions hosted by South Africa
FIFA Beach Soccer World Cup qualification (CAF)
Beach
2008 in beach soccer